Al-Mustafa Army in Iraq (Arabic:جيش المصطفى في العراق) was an Iraqi insurgent group during the Iraqi insurgency.

Attacks and threats 
In March 2005, Al-Mustafa Army (Under the name of Al-Qaeda in Iraq) claimed responsibility for a car bombing in the neighborhood of Bab al-Mu’adham, Iraq. Then in April 2008, openly called war on the Islamic State of Iraq after some back and forth with the organization. In June 2009, Al-Mustafa threatened Obama after making a speech in Egypt.

References 

Jihadist groups in Iraq
Organizations established in 2005
Insurgent groups in Asia
2009 disestablishments in Iraq
Defunct organizations based in Iraq
Iraqi insurgency (2003–2011)